This article lists events from the year 1799 in France

Incumbents
 Until 10 November – the French Directory – five Directors
 From 10 November – the French Consulate – three consuls

Events
 The French Revolutionary Wars resumed, with a number of campaigns
 9 November – Coup of 18 Brumaire
 10 November – disbanding of the French Directory, and establishment of the French Consulate

Births

 20 May – Honoré de Balzac, novelist and playwright (died 1850)
 8 July – Oscar I of Sweden, king of Sweden and Norway (died 1859)
 9 July – Théophile Tilmant, violinist (died 1878)

Deaths

 19 February – Jean-Charles de Borda, mathematician (born 1733)
 5 April – Honoré Fragonard, anatomist (born 1732)
 28 April – François Giroust, composer (born 1737)
 9 May – Claude Balbastre, composer (born 1724)
 18 May – Pierre Beaumarchais, playwright, watchmaker, satirist and revolutionary (born 1732)
 31 May – Pierre Charles Le Monnier, astronomer (born 1715)
 27 June 27 – Élisabeth Jacquet de La Guerre, harpsichordist and composer (b. 1665)
 7 September – Louis-Guillaume Le Monnier, scientist (born 1717)
 17 October – Louis Claude Cadet de Gassicourt, chemist (born 1731)
 9 December – Guillaume Voiriot, portrait painter (born 1712)
 18 December – Jean-Étienne Montucla, mathematician (born 1725)
 31 December – Louis-Jean-Marie Daubenton, naturalist (born 1716)
 31 December – Jean-François Marmontel, historian (born 1723)

See also

References

Links

1790s in France